The Rak Thailand Party was a political party in Thailand. It was founded in 2011, by Chuwit Kamolvisit, a major massage parlor owner. 

In campaign for the 2011 general election, the party was noted for its anti-corruption and protest canvass, presenting leader Chuwit as the "Angry Man". Eventually and to Chuwit's own surprise, the party won 3.07% of the party-list votes and could occupy four of the 500 seats in the House of Representatives. The party's MPs sat on the opposition benches, together with their colleagues, the Democrats. The Election Commission dissolved the party on 11 April 2019.

References

External links
Official website (in Thai)

2011 establishments in Thailand
2019 disestablishments in Thailand
Conservative liberal parties
Conservative parties in Thailand
Defunct political parties in Thailand
Liberal parties in Thailand
Nationalist parties in Asia
Political parties disestablished in 2019
Political parties established in 2011